Genevieve Long Pou (October 23, 1919 – April 22, 2007) was a novelist and writer based in Atlanta, Georgia.

Biography
Pou was born in Tupelo, Mississippi. During her life she published seven mystery novels under the pseudonym Genevieve Holden. She attended the University of Mississippi and the University of Georgia. During World War II, she worked as a journalist on the Birmingham Post and Idaho Statesman newspapers. She married Charles D. Pou, the political editor and columnist for the Atlanta Journal; they had two daughters.

Her mystery novels were all set in the Southern United States and frequently featured a female protagonist. The protagonist would become involved with a dangerous male figure during the course of the story. The locations of the novels matched those in her life. Her early novels were set on Southern farms similar to the one she grew up on near Tupelo. Her last was set in Midtown Atlanta, where she spent the last years of her career and life.

In addition to her mystery novels, Pou was a literary celebrity in Atlanta during the 1960s, 1970s and 1980s. She frequently wrote articles for local magazines and contributed to Atlanta public-affairs television shows. She was well known as a philanthropist and frequent contributor to liberal and feminist political causes.

Pou died from complications of pneumonia in 2007, in Atlanta, Georgia, aged 87.

Selected works
 Killer Loose! (Doubleday, 1953)
 Sound An Alarm (Doubleday, 1954)
 The Velvet Target (Doubleday, 1956)
 Something's Happened To Kate (Doubleday, 1958)
 Deadlier Than The Male (Doubleday, 1961)
 Don't Go In Alone (Doubleday, 1965)
 Down A Dark Alley (Doubleday, 1976)

References

Sources

1919 births
2007 deaths
20th-century American novelists
American women novelists
American mystery writers
People from Tupelo, Mississippi
Novelists from Mississippi
Women mystery writers
20th-century American women writers
Deaths from pneumonia in Georgia (U.S. state)
21st-century American women